Sant Mamet is a mountain of Catalonia, Spain. It has an elevation of 1,391 metres above sea level.

See also
Mountains of Catalonia

References

Mountains of Catalonia